The cuk is a stringed musical instrument from Indonesia. It has 3 strings in 3 courses. It is tuned G4 B3 E4. The strings are made of thick nylon.

The instrument evolved from the Portuguese cavaquinho. The body is usually hollowed out of a solid piece of wood. It is mainly used to play Keroncong music along with the cak.

References

External links
 ATLAS of Plucked Instruments

String instruments
Indonesian musical instruments